Aliou Cissé (born 24 March 1976) is a Senegalese football coach and former player who is the manager of the Senegal national team. Cissé is best known for captaining the Senegal team which reached the 2002 Africa Cup of Nations Final and for being the first Senegal manager to win the tournament in 2022 after reaching the final in 2019.

Having begun his career in France, he later played for English clubs Birmingham City and Portsmouth. Cissé was a defensive midfielder who also, on occasion, played at centre back.

Cissé has been the head coach of Senegal since 2015, having briefly taken charge of them following Amara Traoré's sacking, in a caretaker role in 2012. He was also the assistant coach of the under-23 side from 2012 to 2013, becoming head coach from 2013 to 2015.

Club career
Born in Ziguinchor, Senegal, Cissé moved to Paris at the age of nine where he grew up with dreams of playing for Paris Saint-Germain. He began his career with Lille OSC before moving onto CS Sedan Ardennes and then Paris Saint-Germain. He also spent the majority of the 2001–02 season on loan at Montpellier Herault SC.

After captaining the Senegal national team to the quarter finals of the 2002 FIFA World Cup, Cissé transferred to English club Birmingham City for their 2002–03 season, their debut season in the Premier League. Cissé made his first appearance for the club at Arsenal on the opening day of the season, but was sent off. Though the sending-off was rescinded, he went on to receive five yellow cards in six games, ultimately accumulating ten yellow cards before the New Year. His season, however, was cut short after picking up an injury in February that ruled him out for the rest of the season.

Cissé returned late to pre-season training in July 2003, which led manager Steve Bruce to place him on the transfer list. Cissé eventually got himself back into the first team picture, but his relationship with Bruce continued to sour. After Christmas, Cissé only played three more games that season. At the end of the season he signed for Portsmouth for £300,000 on a two-year contract, despite a strong transfer link to Premiership rivals Bolton Wanderers. The transfer was ultimately one of several included in the Stevens report released in June 2007, which expressed concerns of corruption within English football. Regarding Cissé, the report stated, "Agent Willie McKay acted for Portsmouth in the transfer of Cissé and [...] the inquiry is not prepared to clear these transfers at this stage."

After two years at Portsmouth, Cissé returned to CS Sedan in November 2006 after undergoing a two-week trial. He then signed for French Ligue 2 side Nîmes Olympique from CS Sedan in September 2008. Cissé played seven games during the 2008–09 season before retiring from club football at the age of 33.

International career
Cissé captained the Senegal national team at the 2002 FIFA World Cup. After a 1–0 victory over reigning world champions France on matchday one, the team made it all the way to the quarter finals where they lost 1–0 to Turkey. Cissé was also part of the Senegal team who were the runners-up in the 2002 African Cup of Nations, but was one of the players who missed a penalty during the shootout in the final as they lost to Cameroon.

Managerial career
In early March 2015, Cissé was officially appointed as the head coach for the Senegal national team. The team qualified for the 2018 FIFA World Cup on 10 November 2017, with a 2–0 away win against South Africa. Ultimately, Senegal were knocked out in the group stage of the tournament after becoming the first team in FIFA World Cup history to be eliminated due to fair play tiebreaker rules. "This is one of the rules. We have to respect it," said Cissé. "Of course, we would prefer to be eliminated another way. It's a sad day for us but we knew these were the regulations."

Cissé coached Senegal at the 2019 Africa Cup of Nations tournament, helping Senegal to its first ever final since the 2002, a tournament which Cissé himself also participated when he was the team's captain. However, his Senegal was defeated 1–0 in the final by Algeria, after losing by the same score in the group stage, and missed out on its first ever African trophy.

In February 2019, Senegal's Football Federation (FSF) extended Cissé and his staff's contracts until August 2021.

On 6 February 2022, Cissé led Senegal to victory at the 2021 Africa Cup of Nations. In the final they beat Egypt 4–2 on penalties to clinch their first title, thus redeemed himself after two previous final defeats.

In the 2022 FIFA World Cup, he led the Senegalese national team to the knockout stage for the first time since he was a player in 2002.

Personal life
Cissé lost several members  of his family in the  ferry disaster that occurred off the coast of The Gambia on 26 September 2002. To honour the lives lost, Cissé participated in a charity match between Senegal and Nigeria that raised money for the families of the more than 1,000 reported victims. Birmingham City, one of his former clubs, collected money for the victims' families and honored Cissé by displaying a giant Senegal flag during a game against Manchester City.

Career statistics

Club

Managerial

Honours

Player
Paris Saint-Germain
Coupe de la Ligue runner-up: 1999–2000 
UEFA Intertoto Cup: 2001

Senegal
Africa Cup of Nations runner-up: 2002

Manager
Senegal
Africa Cup of Nations: 2021; runner-up: 2019
African Nations Championship: 2022

Individual
 Africa Cup of Nations Coach of the Tournament: 2021
 CAF Awards Coach of the Year: 2022

References

External links
 
 

1976 births
Living people
People from Ziguinchor
Senegalese footballers
Association football midfielders
Association football defenders
Lille OSC players
CS Sedan Ardennes players
Paris Saint-Germain F.C. players
Montpellier HSC players
Birmingham City F.C. players
Portsmouth F.C. players
Nîmes Olympique players
Ligue 1 players
Premier League players
Ligue 2 players
Senegal international footballers
2002 African Cup of Nations players
2002 FIFA World Cup players
2004 African Cup of Nations players
Senegalese expatriate footballers
Senegalese expatriate sportspeople in England
Senegalese expatriate sportspeople in France
Expatriate footballers in France
Expatriate footballers in England
Senegalese football managers
Senegal national football team managers
2017 Africa Cup of Nations managers
2018 FIFA World Cup managers
2019 Africa Cup of Nations managers
2022 FIFA World Cup managers